The Pakistan Taekwondo Federation (PTF) is the national governing body to develop and promote the sport of Taekwondo in the Pakistan. The federation is headquartered in Rawalpindi.

History 
Taekwondo was introduced in Pakistan by Korean Consulate in Karachi in 1962. The federation was established in 1977 and granted affiliation by World Taekwondo. In 1982, the federation was affiliated with the Pakistan Olympic Association (POA) and Pakistan Sports Board (PSB).

Affiliations
The federation is affiliated with:
 World Taekwondo
 Asian Taekwondo Union
 Pakistan Olympic Association
 Pakistan Sports Board

National Championship 
Taekwondo is regular part of biannual National Games. The federation organize annual National Taekwondo Championship.

Associated Bodies
The following bodies are affiliated with the federation:

Provincial 
 AJK Taekwondo Association
 Sindh Taekwondo Association
 Gilgit-Baltistan Taekwondo Association
 Baluchistan Taekwondo Association
 Punjab Taekwondo Association
 KPK Taekwondo Association
 Islamabad Taekwondo Association

Departmental 
 Higher Education Commission
 Pakistan Police
 Pakistan Railways
 Pakistan Navy
 Pakistan Army
 Pakistan Air Force
 Pakistan WAPDA

References

External links
 Official Website

National members of the Asian Taekwondo Union
Sports governing bodies in Pakistan
1977 establishments in Pakistan
Sports organizations established in 1977
National Taekwondo teams